In mathematics, computable measure theory is the part of computable analysis that deals with effective versions of measure theory.

References 
 Jeremy Avigad (2012), "Inverting the Furstenberg correspondence", Discrete and Continuous Dynamical Systems, Series A, 32, pp. 3421–3431.
 Abbas Edalat  (2009), "A computable approach to measure and integration theory", Information and Computation 207:5, pp. 642–659.
 Stephen G. Simpson (2009), Subsystems of second order arithmetic, 2nd ed., Perspectives in Logic, Cambridge University Press. 

Measure theory
Computable analysis